Chengzi Subdistrict is a subdistrict that stands on eastern  Mentougou District, Beijing, China. It borders Longquan Town in the north and west, Wulituo Subdistrict in the east, Dayu and Dongxinfang Subdistricts in the south. In the year 2020, its population was 44,644.

History

Administrative Divisions 
As of 2021, Chengzi Subdistrict was formed from 20 communities:

See also 

 List of township-level divisions of Beijing

References 

Mentougou District
Subdistricts of Beijing